Île Vierge (Breton language: Enez-Werc'h) is a  islet lying  off the north-west coast of Brittany, opposite the village of Lilia.  It is in the commune of Plouguerneau, in the département of Finistère.  It is the location of the tallest stone lighthouse in Europe, and the tallest "traditional lighthouse" in the world. The International Hydrographic Organization specifies Île Vierge as marking the south-western limit of the English Channel.

History
About 1450, the Conventual Franciscans established an abbey on the island. The name "Île Vierge" probably comes from a chapel dedicated to the Blessed Virgin Mary. In 1507, the monks moved to Aber Wrac'h on the mainland.  In 1844, the French state purchased the island  from sieur Goyon de Coëpel for 6,000 francs.

The lighthouses

It started operation on 15 August 1845, feast day of the Assumption of the Virgin. It remained in use while the second lighthouse was under construction in 1896–1902. A foghorn was installed in 1952, replaced in 1993 by an electric beacon.

The external face is a truncated cone; the interior face is cylindrical, lined with 12,500 opaline glass tiles made by Saint-Gobain. There are five steps to the front door; inside, 360 steps of stone and 32 of iron lead to the lamp platform. The electric lamp was installed in 1952 on the original mechanical turning plate, sitting in a bath of mercury. The plate was replaced with an electric motor in 1983. The lamp has four lenses with a focal length of 0.5m. Electrical generators were installed in 1959, supplemented in 1967–1994 by two wind turbines. The light and rotation are activated automatically by a photoelectric sensor. Although the lighthouse is automated, the site is still staffed.

The island is open to the public from April to September, as is the lighthouse, by appointment. The number of visitors was 5,944 in 2003; 5,974 in 2004; 7,371 in 2005. Both lighthouses are a listed monument since 2011.

See also

 List of lighthouses in France
 List of tallest lighthouses in the world

Notes

External links

Ile Vierge, the highest lighthouse in Europe

Vierge
Lighthouses in Brittany
Lighthouses completed in 1845
Lighthouses completed in 1902
Landforms of Finistère
Tourist attractions in Finistère
Monuments historiques of Finistère
Round towers